Storsveen is a Norwegian surname. Notable people with the surname include:
 Arvid Storsveen (1915–1943), Norwegian military officer
 Rolf Storsveen (born 1959), Norwegian biathlete
  (born 1952), Norwegian historian

Norwegian-language surnames